Swartkops River, also Zwartskop River, (Afrikaans: black hills) is a watercourse in the Eastern Cape province of South Africa. The source of the Swartkops is near Cockscombe Mountain, and it flows east into the Algoa Bay of the Indian Ocean. Its two main tributaries are the northern Kwa-Zunga River and the southern Elands River. The river is also fed by Motherwell Canal, Markman Canal, and Chatty River, which are also sources of water pollution. The river's Groendal Dam was constructed in 1933. The Swartzkops watershed lies with the Uitenhage Artesian Basin. The river suffers from sewage pollution, litter, and algae blooms.

References 

Rivers of the Eastern Cape

af:Swartkopsrivier